Sister Mary may refer to:

Sister Mary (album), album by Irish singer Joe Dolan
"Sister Mary" (song), song by Joe Dolan, title track of above album
Sister Mary (film), 2011 American comedy musical film directed and written by Scott Grenke

People known as Sister Mary

Sister Mary Ignatius Davies (1921−2003), a Sister of Mercy and inspirational music teacher known for her work at the Alpha Boys School
Sister Mary Celine Fasenmyer (1906–1996), American nun and mathematician
Sister Mary Leo (1895–1989), New Zealand nun best known for training some of the world's finest sopranos
Sister Mary Irene FitzGibbon (1823–1896), England-born American nun, founder of the New York Foundling Hospital in 1869
 Sister Mary Melanie Holliday (1850-1939), American Catholic nun and member of the Sisters of Mercy

See also
Sister Mary Ignatius Explains It All For You, 1979 stage play by Christopher Durang
Sister Mary Explains It All, 2001 film adaptation of above and directed by Marshall Brickman
Sister Mary Elephant, a comedy skit by Cheech and Chong